Newtownstewart is a village and townland of  in County Tyrone, Northern Ireland. It is overlooked by hills called Bessy Bell and Mary Gray and lies on the River Strule below the confluence with its tributary the Owenkillew. It is situated in the historic barony of Strabane Lower and the civil parish of Ardstraw. In the 2011 Census it had a population of 1,551 people. It lies within the Derry City and Strabane District Council area. Councillor Kieran McGuire has represented Newtownstewart since 2006.

History 

The townland of Newtownstewart was historically called Lislas. Newtownstewart Castle was built by Sir Robert Newcomen in 1615 as part of the Plantation of Ulster. The castle was acquired by Sir William Stewart when he married Newcommen's second daughter in 1629. The castle and town were renamed Newtownstewart by Sir William Stewart after his birthplace.

The former Northern Bank building on the corner was the scene of an infamous murder in 1871 when bank cashier William Glass was robbed of £1,600 and killed. Assistant District Inspector Thomas Hartley Montgomery, of the Royal Irish Constabulary, who was in charge of the investigation, was subsequently tried, convicted, and hanged at Omagh Gaol.

Newtownstewart Town Hall, which was the venue for petty session hearings, was completed in 1880.

Royal Visit
The Duke and Duchess of York visited the Duke of Abercorn at Baronscourt as part of their Royal Visit to Northern Ireland in 1924.

Sport

Newtownstewart St. Eugene's is the local Gaelic Athletic Association club.

Ardstraw Football Club is the local football club. They have a strong connection to the town with many players coming from within the town and the surrounding area.

Two Castles ABC is the local boxing Club. Formed in 2012, it has won over 30 Irish National Boxing Titles.

Also a new football club has recently been formed. Newtown United funded by Castle Bar has entered the Fermanagh and Wester league and had a good start under a local manager who lead them to multiple important wins but eventually he resigned. Now the new manager is unknown but since they have dropped form. The local manager had brought this team into the league with many critics who didn’t believe in them. He played a good style of football which lead to them topping the league before resigning.

Demographics
On Census Day 27 March 2011, in Newtownstewart Settlement, considering the resident population:
 
99.74% were from the white (including Irish Traveller) ethnic group;
52.87% belong to or were brought up in the Catholic religion and 45.84% belong to or were brought up in a 'Protestant and Other Christian (including Christian related)' religion; and
43.58% indicated that they had a British national identity, 25.53% had an Irish national identity and 33.33% had a Northern Irish national identity*.
Respondents could indicate more than one national identity
 
Considering the population aged 3 years old and over:
 
11.82% had some knowledge of Irish;
7.59% had some knowledge of Ulster-Scots; and
1.68% did not have English as their first language.

People
 Thomas Burnside (1782–1851), member of the United States House of Representatives from Pennsylvania and associate justice of the Supreme Court of Pennsylvania, born near Newtownstewart.
 Thomas Maclear (1794–1879), Astronomer Royal at the Cape of Good Hope, was born in Newtownstewart.
 Dukes of Abercorn, reside at Baronscourt, near Newtownstewart
 Johnny Loughrey, Irish singer born in Newtownstewart in 1945, died in 2005.
 Jude Gallagher, amateur boxer, won multiple Irish Titles, World Youth Bronze and Commonwealth Games Featherweight Champion, 2022
 Jacob Stockdale, Ulster and Ireland rubgy player, was born in Newtownstewart.

Transport
Construction of the Irish gauge (Irish Standard Gauge), Londonderry and Enniskillen Railway (L&ER) began in 1845 and reached Strabane in 1847. By 1852 it had extended to Newtownstewart and Omagh and its terminus in Enniskillen was reached in 1854. The company was absorbed into the Great Northern Railway (Ireland) in 1883. Newtownstewart railway station opened on 9 May 1852 and finally closed on 15 February 1965.

See also 
List of towns and villages in Northern Ireland

Notes

References

External links

Bronze Age burial cist - Newtownstewart
Stewart Castle

Villages in County Tyrone
Civil parish of Ardstraw